Thermeola is a monotypic moth genus in the subfamily Arctiinae. Its only species, Thermeola tasmanica, is found in the Australian state of Tasmania. The genus and species were described by George Hampson in 1900.

References

Lithosiini
Moths described in 1900
Monotypic moth genera